Attawapiskat may refer to:
 Attawapiskat Airport, an airport adjacent to the Attawapiskat First Nation in Ontario, Canada
 Attawapiskat First Nation, a First Nation located in Kenora District in northern Ontario, Canada
 Attawapiskat 91, formerly the main reserve of the Attawapiskat First Nation
 Attawapiskat 91A, the main reserve of the Attawapiskat First Nation, near the mouth of the Attawapiskat River

Geography
 Attawapiskat Formation, a geologic formation in Ontario
 Attawapiskat kimberlite field, a field of kimberlite pipes located astride the Attawapiskat River in the Hudson Bay Lowlands, in Northern Ontario
 Attawapiskat Lake, a lake in Kenora District, Ontario, Canada
 Attawapiskat River, a river in Kenora District in northwestern Ontario, Canada, that flows east from Attawapiskat Lake to James Bay